Lokia is a genus of dragonfly in the family Libellulidae. It contains the following species:

Lokia circe 
Lokia coryndoni 
Lokia ellioti 
Lokia erythromelas 
Lokia gamblesi 
Lokia incongruens 
Lokia modesta

References

Libellulidae
Taxa named by Friedrich Ris
Anisoptera genera
Taxonomy articles created by Polbot